Newhalem (Lushootseed: dxʷʔiyb) is a small unincorporated community in northwestern Washington, United States, located in the western foothills of the North Cascades along the Skagit River.  It is located within Whatcom County.

Description
Newhalem is a company town owned by Seattle City Light and populated entirely by employees of the Skagit River Hydroelectric Project, or of local county, state or federal agencies.  The town is not open to permanent residents who do not work for these agencies.  The Ross Lake National Recreation Area surrounds Newhalem on all sides, and the North Cascades National Park boundary is approximately one mile to the north and south of the town.  Newhalem does not have an assigned US Postal Service zip code and thus, for postal purposes, is considered part of Rockport (98283).  

The name Newhalem has its roots in a local indigenous language as meaning 'Goat Snare', as the natives used to trap mountain goats in the area.  

In pre-Colonial times, the site was inhabited by members of the Upper Skagits.

There was a school in Newhalem a long time ago but it was demolished because the population had severely dropped. Now the students have about a -hour bus to Concrete.

Climate
Newhalem has plentiful rainfall year-round, but with significantly less rainfall in the summer months than in winter. According to the Köppen climate classification, Newhalem has an oceanic climate (Cfb).

Newhalem in literature and film
The writer Tobias Wolff lived in Newhalem as a boy in the late 1950s, after his mother moved from west Seattle to marry a mechanic who lived in one of the company houses. In his memoir, This Boy's Life, he calls this isolated settlement "Chinook," and describes how the nearest high school was a long bus ride away, in a slightly larger hamlet called Concrete. In the 1993 film version of This Boy's Life, starring Robert De Niro and Leonardo DiCaprio, the two places are combined and called "Concrete."

Portions of the 1983 Hollywood movie WarGames, starring Matthew Broderick, were filmed in Newhalem  (most notably the scenes of the "Cheyenne Mountain Complex",  filmed in an abandoned gravel pit northwest of the town).

Newhalem summer softball tournament
Each third weekend of July since 1977 there has been a "mushball" softball tournament. The competitors are Skagit Valley teams. Players camp a mile from the fields. On the second morning is a pancake feed at the firehall. The single field presents challenges not normally found at softball tournaments, plus the 7am start on Saturday.

Highway 20
Newhalem is the final place on Highway 20 to purchase supplies before crossing Rainy Pass and entering Eastern Washington.

References

Seattle City Light
Company towns in Washington (state)
Unincorporated communities in Washington (state)
Unincorporated communities in Whatcom County, Washington
North Cascades of Washington (state)